Nicole de Moor (born 1984) is a Belgian politician, a member of CD&V. On 28 June 2022, she became Secretary of State for Asylum and Migration in the government of Alexander De Croo.

Early life and career
De Moor studied law at Ghent University and the University of Amsterdam. From August 2008 to May 2009, she was a legal advisor at the Flemish Minorities Center and from May 2009 to November 2013, she was a researcher at Ghent University. In 2014, she obtained her doctorate in law. From November 2013 to November 2014, she worked as the Commissioner General for Refugees and Stateless Persons. Since 2021, she has been a member of the board of directors of the Koninklijke Vlaamse Schouwburg.
De Moor is married and mother of two children.

Political career
In November 2014, De Moor was a migration specialist in the cabinets of CD&V ministers Kris Peeters,  and Koen Geens, and in October 2020, she became head of cabinet to State Secretary for Asylum and Migration Sammy Mahdi.

In the 2019, Flemish elections, she was the first successor on the CD&V list in the Brussels-Capital constituency, obtaining 379 votes.

At the end of June 2022, the party nominated De Moor as Secretary of State for Asylum and Migration, in charge of the National Lottery and Deputy to the Minister of the Interior, Institutional Reforms and Democratic Renewal, in the De Croo Government, to succeed Mahdi, who had become party chairman. On 28 June, she took the oath before the king.

References

External link

1984 births
20th-century Belgian women politicians
21st-century Belgian women politicians
21st-century Belgian politicians
Government ministers of Belgium
Living people
Christian Democratic and Flemish politicians
Women government ministers of Belgium
Ghent University alumni
University of Amsterdam alumni